The Redwall Limestone is a resistant cliff-forming unit of Mississippian age that forms prominent, red-stained cliffs in the Grand Canyon, ranging in height from  to .

Lithology 
Redwall Limestone consists predominantly of light-olive-gray to light-gray, fine- to coarse-grained, thin- to thick-bedded, often cherty, limestone. Its lower part consists of brownish-gray, interbedded finely crystalline dolomite and fine- to coarse-grained limestone with layers of white chert lenses and yellowish-gray and brownish-gray, cliff-forming, thick-bedded, fine-grained dolomite. It is divided into Horseshoe Mesa Member, Mooney Falls Member, Thunder Springs Member, and Whitmore Wash Member. Its origins date to the Mississippian age.

Contacts 
The upper and lower contacts of the Redwall Limestone are both unconformities. Locally, the Redwall Limestone directly overlies the unconformity that forms its lower contact consisting of a basal conglomerate. This basal conglomerate is typically composed of gravel that is locally derived from either the underlying Temple Butte Formation or Muav Limestone. The Temple Butte Formation consists of a thin layer of Devonian strata that fills paleovalleys cut into the underlying Cambrian Muav Limestone. Outside of the paleovalleys, the Redwall Limestone overlies the Muav Limestone.

The upper contact of the Redwall Limestone consists of a deeply eroded disconformity characterized by deeply incised paleovalleys and deep paleokarst depressions that are often filled by sediments of the Surprise Canyon Formation.

See also
 Geology of the Grand Canyon area

References

Further reading
 Blakey, Ron and Wayne Ranney, Ancient Landscapes of the Colorado Plateau, Grand Canyon Association (publisher), 2008, 176 pages, 
 Chronic, Halka. Roadside Geology of Arizona, Mountain Press Publishing Co., 1983, 23rd printing, pp. 229–232, 
 Lucchitta, Ivo, Hiking Arizona's Geology, 2001, Mountaineers's Books,

External links 

 Abbot, W, (2001) Revisiting the Grand Canyon – Through the Eyes of Seismic Sequence Stratigraphy. Search and Discovery Article # 40018, America Association of Petroleum Geologists, Tulsa, Oklahoma.
 Anonymous (nda) The Redwall Limestone Formation.  Utah Geology.
 Mathis, A., and C. Bowman (2007) The Grand Age of Rocks: The Numeric Ages for Rocks Exposed within Grand Canyon, Grand Canyon National Park, Arizona, National Park Service, Grand Canyon National Park, Arizona.
 Shur, C., and D. Shur (2008) The Mississippi Redwall Limestone In Northern Arizona. Arizona Fossil Adventures.

Limestone formations of the United States
Natural history of the Grand Canyon
Geologic formations of Arizona
Geologic formations of Utah
Carboniferous Arizona
Carboniferous geology of Utah
Carboniferous System of North America
Carboniferous southern paleotropical deposits